Richard Marienstras (18 January 1928 – 22 February 2011) was a French anglicist and France's foremost expert on Shakespeare.

Life
Marienstras was born in Warsaw to a middle-class PolishJewish family. His parents divorced when he was three years old, and his mother took him abroad, travelling around Italy until they settled on the Riviera. He grew up bilingual in Polish and French and studied at the Lycée Janson-de-Sailly in Paris, until the war. Moving to the unoccupied southeastern part of Vichy France, he was called up prematurely, aged 15, to work in the Service du travail obligatoire (STO) whereupon he fled to Vercours where, the only intellectual in his group, he joined the French Resistance.

At war's end, he worked for three years assisting Holocaust survivors to find asylum, learning that his father had been one of the victims. In 1948 he went to the newly established state of Israel where he fought in the Arab-Israeli war, only to return soon after the cessation of hostilities with a sense of disillusionment, and rejoined his family in a pension on Rue Saint-Jacques. His friendship with the future novelist André Schwarz-Bart dates to this period.

He taught himself English and with his wife Elise, a young historian who also was of Polish-Jewish background, moved to Habib Bourguiba's Tunis in 1957, which by then had gained its independence. There he spent four years teaching French in secondary schools and earned his agrégation certificate. He then taught in the United States for two years (1961-1963). On his return to France he was given a position to teach at the Sorbonne. When the general strike of May 1968 broke out, Marienstras supported the students, even helping them raise barricades on Rue Monsieur-le-Prince. When Edgar Faure's reform split up Paris University into 13 different branches, Marienstras was responsible for creating the anglophone branch of the UFR, and thereafter served as professor of English at Paris Diderot University.

He thought of Jews as a "diaspora people." In 1967, together with Pierre Vidal-Naquet, Marienstras founded Le Cercle Gaston-Crémieux whose purpose, according to Sylvain Cypel, was the promotion of Jewish life in the diaspora without its being "feudalised" by either the synagogue or Zionism. Marienstras was a staunch advocate for the preservation of Yiddish and its culture.

Work on Shakespeare
His life work was deeply inflected by his experiences of World War Two, which caused him to reflect on the problem of survival in the wake of catastrophe. The resonance of the Shoah's incinerated victims can be sensed throughout Marienstras's analysis in his masterpiece, The Near and the Far (Le Proche et le Lointain), of the imagery of sacrificial carnage, of smoking corpses, in Shakespeare's plays, and the "natural stench" imputed to Jews by many of Shakespeare's contemporaries such as Sir Thomas Browne.

In his posthumously published Shakespeare and the world's disorder, the culmination of almost half a century of critical attention to Shakespeare's works, Marienstras analysed the patterns of political disintegration – marked by the arbitrariness of power, the legitimization of violence and the eclipse of the sacred – and "ontological erosion" he considered to lie at the heart of Shakespearean tragedy.  He argued that even in the comedies, where tensions are finally resolved harmoniously, one cannot but sense that the reconciliations remain precarious.

Notes

Citations

Sources

1928 births
2011 deaths
French Resistance members
Lycée Janson-de-Sailly alumni
Academic staff of Paris Diderot University
Shakespearean scholars